Amédée "Meddie" Gallant (October 24, 1848 – June 19, 1933) was a farmer, fish exporter and political figure on Prince Edward Island. He represented 1st Prince in the Legislative Assembly of Prince Edward Island from 1898 to 1899 as a Liberal.

He was born in Bloomfield, Prince Edward Island, the son of Fabien Gallant. In 1877, he married Véronique Pineau. He was elected to the provincial assembly in an 1898 by-election held after Edward Hackett resigned his seat to run for a federal seat. However, the by-election result was then contested under the provincial Controverted Elections Act, and was overturned by Justice E. J. Hodgson on February 7, 1899. The by-election was rerun on July 25, 1899, and was won by Henry Pineau.

He was supervisor of highways for West Prince. Gallant died in Bloomfield at the age of 84.

References 
 

Prince Edward Island Liberal Party MLAs
1848 births
1933 deaths
People from Prince County, Prince Edward Island